Standing in the Dark may refer to:

 Standing in the Dark (album), a 1983 album by Platinum Blonde, as well as the album's title song
 "Standing in the Dark" (song), a 2012 song by Lawson
 "Standing in the Dark", a song by Brett Kissel from the 2023 album The Compass Project
 "Standing in the Dark", a two-part episode of Degrassi: The Next Generation